Brandon Brooks (born 1989) is an American football guard.

Brandon Brooks may also refer to:
 Brandon Brooks (basketball) (born 1987), American professional basketball player
 Brandon Brooks (water polo) (born 1981), American water polo goalie